Ga-Molepo is a town in Capricorn District Municipality in the Limpopo province of South Africa.

Molepo means a place or a moment of relaxation. The language spoken by the majority in Ga Molepo is Sesotho sa Leboa. Ga Molepo is made up of over thirty villages, the main one is called Boshega where (Kgoshi ya Ditlou, literally king of elephants) Chief Molepo's palace is situated at the foot of the Lebopo mountains.

Historical background 
The Molepo's are Kalanga (bakgalaka) who separated with Chief Makgoba at mount Kgatla, and settled at the Royal Capital of Boshega. Upon their arrival they found the Makubu clan led by Molelemane Maloka.

Geography 
Ga-Molepo is surrounded by big Lebopo mountains (Lebopo means Border) and through it runs several rivers: Hlabashane, Mphogodiba, Mokgotla and Mmamatebele.

Religion in Ga Molepo 
Although the majority of people in Ga Molepo believe in African Traditional Religion, the town's leadership has always been open to people from different religions. Apart from welcoming the arrival of the Roman Catholic Church missionaries, who settled at Subiaco Mission in Ga Rampheri, the leadership of Ga Molepo has been in contact with missionaries from as far as the Kingdom of Lesotho as early as 1873.

Tourist attractions 
It is the home of the biggest Zion Christian Church (ZCC) church situated at one of the villages called Boyne, one of the villages is Ga-Rampheri where there is a big dam in the Mphogodiba River. The people of Ga-Molepo mostly depend on subsistence farming although rainfall is sparse.

Notable residents 
John Mpe, incumbent mayor of Capricorn district municipality.
Phaswane Mpe, author of Welcome to Our Hillbrow, a novel which deals with issues of xenophobia, AIDS, tradition, and inner city status in the Hillbrow neighborhood of post-apartheid Johannesburg. Mpe was also a lecturer of African Literature at the University of the Witwatersrand.

References

Populated places in the Polokwane Local Municipality